Point Township may refer to the following townships in the United States:

 Point Township, Posey County, Indiana
 Point Township, Northumberland County, Pennsylvania